Christina Fusano (born November 27, 1980) is an American former professional tennis player. She attended Ponderosa High School in Shingle Springs, California, where she was an all-league volleyball and basketball player. In tennis, she was the top-ranked junior in Northern California from 1997–99.

Biography
Fusano competed collegiately for the University of California, where she was ranked as high as No. 25 in NCAA Division 1 singles and with Raquel Kops-Jones was the 2003 NCAA Doubles champion. She also was a 2-time Pac 10 Doubles champion, 2002 and 2003.

Fusano's career-high WTA doubles ranking is world No. 84, set on August 4, 2008. Her career high WTA singles ranking is world No. 417, which she reached on February 21, 2005. She played for the Delaware Smash of WTT. She previously played for the Boston Lobsters in 2007 and 2009 she played for the New York Sportimes. She served as a substitute for the Sacramento Capitals in 2010 and 2011.

In July 2011, Fusano won the US Open National Playoffs Sectional Qualifying Tournament Final in mixed doubles with partner David Martin to qualify for the 2011 US Open. Fusano retired from professional tennis 2014.

WTA career finals

Doubles: 1 (1 title)

ITF finals

Doubles: 29 (13–16)

External links
 
 
 College Tennis Profile for Christina Fusano
 Christina Fusano Visits Hospital for Children – Jan 15, 2007
 WTT Bio
 Cal Bio
 US Open Qualifying

1980 births
Living people
American female tennis players
American people of Italian descent
Place of birth missing (living people)
Tennis people from California
California Golden Bears women's tennis players